The Ewenny River is a river in South Wales. For most of its  length, it forms the border between the Vale of Glamorgan and Bridgend. It is a major tributary of the River Ogmore, which it joins near its estuary.

Course
The river rises to the north east of Bridgend town, in South Wales, where two minor rivers known as Ewenny Fach and Ewenny Fawr join. Ewenny Fach is considered a tributary of the Ewenny Fawr, which in turn is formed when three streams, Nant Canna, Nant Ciwc and Nant Crymlyn join. This branch of the river flows southeast, past the village of Pencoed and under the M4 Motorway until it is joined by the Ewenny Fach south of Junction 35 of the road . From here, the river turns southward and flows through the Ewenni Moor, past the village of Waterton. Waterton is the site of a large industrial estate, and a few miles of meandering river were straightened and diverted to prevent flooding. The river flows through the villages of Ewenny and Ogmore, before entering the River Ogmore estuary just below where Ogmore Castle is on the river. One of its main tributaries is the Afon Alun, which flows west for a few miles, and converges with the Ewenny north of Ogmore.

Fishing
The river has very good grayling, and also sewin.

Mouth
The river joins the Ogmore near Ogmore Castle, which is south of the river. At the confluence, a series of stepping stones cross the river. However, these only cross the Ewenny river, and not the Ogmore.

References

External links 
www.geograph.co.uk : photos of the River Ewenny and surrounding area

Rivers of Bridgend County Borough
Rivers of the Vale of Glamorgan